The Alliance, formerly the Alliance for Sweden (Allians för Sverige), was a centre-right liberal-conservative political alliance in Sweden. The Alliance consisted of the four centre-right political parties in the Riksdag. The Alliance was formed while in opposition, and later achieved a majority government in the 2006 general election and a minority government in the 2010 general election, governing Sweden from 2006 to 2014 with Fredrik Reinfeldt of the Moderate Party serving as Prime Minister of Sweden until 2014. The Alliance was co-chaired by every component party's individual leaders.

After defeat in the 2014 Swedish general election, the Moderate Party's parliamentary group leader Anna Kinberg Batra announced to the Riksdag that the political alliance "would operate in opposition". On 11 January 2019, during the 2018–2019 Swedish government formation, the Centre Party and Liberals agreed to tolerate the re-election as Prime Minister of Social Democratic incumbent Stefan Löfven. Moderate Party leader Ulf Kristersson and Christian Democrat leader Ebba Busch denounced the agreement, with Busch calling the Alliance "a closed chapter".

Members 

The Alliance consisted of the four centre-right (lit. "bourgeois") parties in the Riksdag (Sweden's parliament). The members were:
The Moderate Party (M), a liberal conservative party.
The Centre Party (C), a liberal, former agrarian party.
The Christian Democrats (KD), a Christian democratic party.
The Liberals (L, formerly the Liberal People's Party), a liberal party.

History 
Swedish politics had been dominated by the Social Democratic Party for over 70 years. They had been in government for all but nine years since 1932 (summer of 1936, 1976–1982, 1991–1994). The opposition parties decided that this was partly because they did not present a clear and viable alternative government. At a 2004 meeting held in the Centre Party leader Maud Olofsson's home in the village of Högfors, the four centre-right leaders at the time; Göran Hägglund (KD), Lars Leijonborg (L), Maud Olofsson (C) and Fredrik Reinfeldt (M) decided to form the political cooperation that would become The Alliance. The meeting ended on 31 August 2004 with the presentation of a joint declaration outlining the principles under which the four parties intended to fight the election. A year later a similar meeting was held at Christian Democrat leader Göran Hägglund's home in Bankeryd, resulting in the affirmation of the alliance and another declaration.

Aims and policies 

The centre-right Alliance for Sweden aimed to win a majority of seats in the 2006 Riksdag elections and to form a coalition government.

In order to do this, the member parties decided to issue common policy statements and to draft a joint election manifesto. Each individual party still had its own manifesto and policies, but these would build up from common proposals in the Alliance's joint proposals. The Alliance had policy working groups for six areas: economic policy, education policy, foreign policy, the welfare state, employment and business policy, and policing. These were not set according to party size, but with one senior politician (often an MP) and one staff per party, and following the idea that "everybody contributes and everybody gains".

An example of this policy cooperation was the budget proposal that the Alliance parties put forward on 2 October 2005. The core proposal was a tax cut of 49 billion Swedish kronor, which is 1.9% of GDP and 3.3% of the total income of the public sector in 2005. Each individual party also proposed its own policies in addition. For example, the Liberals waned to spend 1bn kronor extra on tertiary education and the Christian Democrats want to have more benefits and tax deductions for families.

On 14 June 2006 Alliance for Sweden agreed on a common energy policy which would apply over the next parliamentary term (2006–2010), and included a promise not to shut down any more nuclear reactors during that period (Barsebäck 2 was shut down in 2005). The proposal was that no more reactors were to be built, that the nuclear phase-out law would be repealed and that all forms of energy research would be legal and able to receive state grants (research on nuclear power is currently forbidden in Sweden). An Alliance government would also grant any applications to increase the output of the existing plants, provided that it would be safe to do so. This has been hailed as a historic step, as disagreement over nuclear power has long plagued the centre-right in Sweden: the Centre Party opposes nuclear power, the Moderates and Christian Democrats support its continuing operation while the Liberals want to build more reactors. Some doubts were raised about the long-term survival of this compromise, as neither the Centre Party nor the Liberals have changed their fundamental positions on nuclear power.

On 5 July 2006, during the politics week at Almedalen on Gotland, the Alliance parties announced a plan to abolish property tax. Their agreement promised to freeze taxable values at the current level (so that the revaluation that was being carried out would not apply), and to reduce the rate of tax on apartments from 0.5% to 0.4% of their taxable value. A ceiling of 5,000 kronor would also be imposed on the taxation of the value of a house's plot. The parties also agreed on the abolition of the tax and its replacement with a municipal charge independent of the value of the property; this reform was planned to be carried out in 2008. Property tax is estimated to bring in 28.1 billion kronor in 2006, rising to 30.2bn in 2007 and 32.2bn in 2008 (as taxable values rise). The first stage of the Alliance's plan (freezing property values, capping the tax on land value and reducing the rate for apartments) is estimated to cost around 4-5 billion kronor. The financing of this was to be revealed in the Alliance's manifesto in August 2006.

Alliance for Sweden released its election manifesto, entitled More people in work - more to share, on 23 August 2006.

The result of the election was clear enough on election night for Moderate Party leader Fredrik Reinfeldt to declare himself the victor and for Göran Persson to announce his resignation as Prime Minister and as leader of the Social Democratic Party. The four centre-right parties of Alliance for Sweden formed a government with Fredrik Reinfeldt as Prime Minister, which was presented to the Riksdag on 6 October.

In government (2006–2014) 

Minister for Finance Anders Borg presented the government's first budget on 16 October 2006. The budget contains many of the proposals that were prominent in the Alliance's election campaign: both the job deduction in the income tax, which will also be larger for old people to encourage them to remain in the labour market, and the "fresh start jobs" with reduced payroll tax for companies employing people who have been unemployed for more than a year will come into effect from 1 January 2007. Tax reductions for companies hiring young people and for domestic services are to come into effect on 1 July. The tax reductions announced in the budget total 42 billion Swedish kronor, of which the income tax deduction is 38.7 billion. Other changes include the ending of employers' co-financing of sickness benefit after the second week, reduction of unemployment benefits and considerably raised fees to unemployment funds, resulting in a substantial decline in union density and density of unemployment funds. Unemployment benefit would remain 80% of previous pay for 200 days then drop to 70%. Benefit would be payable for a maximum of 300 days, or 450 if the recipient has children.

List of party leaders

Electoral history

The parties had previously formed a centre-right minority coalition government in 1991 with the support of the right-wing populist party New Democracy. After the coalition was defeated in the 1994 election, the Centre-Right Parties coalition was dissolved but the centre-right opposition parties continued to work together. In 2004, the four parties which formed the Centre-Right Parties in 1991, the Moderate Party, Centre Party, Liberal People's Party and Christian Democrats wanted to collaborate again, so they founded The Alliance as a new coalition of the centre-right parties.

Parliament (Riksdag)

European Parliament

See also 
Red-Greens (Sweden)

References

External links 

 
Official website of the government of Sweden 
Fler i arbete - mer att dela på  - the Alliance's joint manifesto 
Putting Sweden to work - a good deal for all - the budget for 2007 

2004 establishments in Sweden
2019 disestablishments in Sweden
Centre-right politics
Coalition governments
Political party alliances in Sweden
2004 in politics
Liberal conservatism
Liberalism in Sweden
Conservatism in Sweden